Manthri Maalikayil Manasammatham is a 1998 Indian Malayalam film, directed by Kalabhavan Ansar and produced by Noushad. The film stars George Vishnu, Jagathy Sreekumar, Harisree Ashokan Job Pottas and Meera in the lead roles. The film has musical score by Berny-Ignatius.

Cast
George Vishnu as Sreekuttan
Dileep as Alex
Jagathy Sreekumar as Samaran
Harisree Ashokan as Achu (Sreekuttan's Friend)
Narendra Prasad as Chekuthan Lawrence
Jose Prakash as Sreekuttan's Father
Meera as Asha Lawrence
Kalabhavan Mani as Cleetus
Maathu as Rexy
Kozhikode Narayanan Nair as Alex's Father
Chitra as Jayakumari
Sadiq as Alex's brother
Narayanankutty as Vinod
Bindhu Varappuzha as Vinod's Wife
Tini Tom as Prasad 
Kalabhavan Rahman as Driver Mohan
Sainuddin as Jhony
Reena as Wife of Lawrence 
Sreehari as Stanly
Moideen Koya as Prabhakaran
 Kollam Siraj as Antony (Lazar's Personal Assistant)

Soundtrack
The music was composed by Berny-Ignatius and the lyrics were written by Kaithapram.

References

External links
 

1998 films
1990s Malayalam-language films
Films scored by Berny–Ignatius